Jean Rousset (20 February 1910 – 15 September 2002) was a Swiss literary critic who worked on French literature, and in particular on Baroque literature of the late Renaissance and early seventeenth century. He is sometimes grouped with the Geneva School and with early Structuralism.

Biography
Jean Rousset began his studies in law, before changing to literature.  He studied under Albert Thibaudet and Marcel Raymond and after working as a French lecturer in Halle and Munich, became professor at the University of Geneva.  His thesis on French literature of the baroque period, published under the title La Littérature de l’âge baroque en France : Circé et le paon, was an immense critical success.  It was one of the first studies to use the term "baroque" – which had been, up to that point, used exclusively in art history – to refer to literary works.  Under the signs of the sorceress Circe and the ornamental peacock (paon), and following the art historical analysis of Heinrich Wölfflin, Rousset explored movement, instability, ostentation, decoration and metamorphosis in the plays, novels and poetry of the period.  He would return to the same period in his L’Intérieur et l’extérieur : essais sur la poésie et le théâtre au XVIIe siècle.

His 1963 work, his book Forme et signification explored new theoretical possibilities; Jacques Derrida has called it one of the principal works of early structuralism.  Distancing himself from the phenomenological approach of his friends and associates Georges Poulet and Jean-Pierre Richard, Rousset focussed on formal elements such as narrative structure in determining the meaning of a work.  He would continue on this formal and narratological approach in his Narcisse romancier : essai sur la première personne dans le roman (which explored the role of first person narration in novels) and Le Lecteur intime.  In this way, his work of this period shares many characteristics with the work of Gérard Genette.  

His later works of theory and criticism were however less centered on a purely structural approach.  His "Leurs yeux se rencontrèrent" : la scène de première vue dans le roman explored the common place of "love at first sight" in the novel.  His last book, Dernier regard sur le baroque, was a final assessment of theory and theoretical debates concerning the baroque period.

Works
 1953 - La Littérature de l’âge baroque en France: Circé et le paon
 1963 - Forme et signification, essais sur les structures littéraires de Corneille à Claudel
 1968 - L’Intérieur et l’extérieur: essais sur la poésie et le théâtre au XVIIe siècle - on Jean de Sponde and Jean de La Ceppède
 1972 - Narcisse romancier: essai sur la première personne dans le roman - on first person narration in novels
 1981 - "Leurs yeux se rencontrèrent": la scène de première vue dans le roman
 1986 - Le Lecteur intime, de Balzac au journal
 1988 - Anthologie de la Poésie baroque française - anthology
 1990 - Passages, échanges et transpositions
 1998 - Dernier regard sur le baroque

See also
 Structuralism
 New Criticism

References
 This article is based on the biography published on Rousset's editor's site (see below).

Further reading
Derrida, Jacques.  "Force and Signification".  In Writing and Difference.  Trans. Alan Bass.  Chicago: University of Chicago Press, 1978.  3–30.

External links
 Jean Rousset site on José Corti editions (in French)

1910 births
2002 deaths
Writers from Geneva
Swiss writers in French
Swiss literary critics
Members of the Académie royale de langue et de littérature françaises de Belgique
Swiss male writers